Richmond Road Halt was a minor railway station or halt in north Devon, situated fairly close to the town of Appledore, a community lying on the peninsula formed by the sea (Bideford Bay), the River Torridge, and the River Taw.

History 
The halt was opened in 1908 and the next stop on the line was Lovers' Lane Halt, followed by the terminus at Appledore, some 7½ miles from Bideford. This line had until 1901 run only as far as Northam.

Infrastructure
Richmond Road Halt had a simple single platform, raised one foot above rail level, with a shelter, without lighting and with a level crossing without gates. It had no freight facilities. It was situated on the left just before the crossroads with Broad Lane and the Burrows Road that used to be called Richmond Road.

Micro history
The trackbed from Appledore to Richmond Road Halt and beyond was converted into a road and the station buildings were demolished.

See also

 Northam station
 Westward Ho! station

References 
Notes

Sources
Baxter, Julia & Jonathan (1980). The Bideford, Westward Ho! and Appledore railway 1901–1917. Pub. Chard. .
Garner, Rod (2008). The Bideford, Westward Ho! & Appledore Railway. Pub. Kestrel Railway Books. .
Jenkins, Stanley C. (1993). The Bideford, Westward Ho! and Appledore Railway. Oxford : Oakwood Press. .
Stuckey, Douglas (1962). The Bideford, Westward Ho! and Appledore Railway 1901–1917. Pub. West Country Publications.

Disused railway stations in Devon
Former Bideford, Westward Ho! and Appledore Railway stations
Railway stations in Great Britain opened in 1908
Railway stations in Great Britain closed in 1917
1908 establishments in England
Torridge District